Das Traumhotel is a German/Austrian television series.

See also
List of German television series

External links
 

2004 German television series debuts
2014 German television series endings
German-language television shows
Das Erste original programming
Television series set in hotels